Alexandria Municipal Airport , also known as Chandler Field, is a city-owned public-use airport located two nautical miles (3.7 km) southwest of the central business district of Alexandria, a city in Douglas County, Minnesota, United States.

Facilities and aircraft 
It has two asphalt paved runways: 13/31 is 5,099 by 100 feet (1,554 x 30 m) and 4/22 is 4,098 by 75 feet (1,249 x 23 m).

For the 12-month period ending August 31, 2014, the airport had 25,500 aircraft operations, an average of 70 per day: 90% general aviation, 9% air taxi and 1% military. In August 2021, there were 74 aircraft based at this airport: 68 single-engine, 3 multi-engine, 1 helicopter and 2 ultralights.

Cargo

Airport Operations 
Several operations and/or businesses at the airport include the following:
Alexandria Aircraft LLC - Parts dealer for Bellanca aircraft.
Alexandria Aviation - Aircraft Sales, Rental, Flight Training, Chater, Fueling
LifeLink III - 24/7 medical helicopter service
On His Wings Flight Academy - Instrument flight instruction school
Weber's Aero Repair - Aircraft repairs and restorations

Historical Scheduled Service 

Northwest Airlines offered service to Alexandria on its Minneapolis to Winnipeg, Canada route in 1928.

In August of 1929, Several Minneapolis and Winnipeg, Canada investors formed Canadian-American Airlines, Incorporated.  Using six-passenger Travel Air monoplanes, the new line provided for daily five-hour flights between St. Paul and Winnipeg with stops at Minneapolis, St. Cloud, Alexandria, Fergus Falls, Fargo ND, and Grand Forks, ND.

In 1952 Wisconsin Central Airlines began scheduled service for a short time. The flight route was from Minneapolis–St. Paul International Airport, St. Cloud, Alexandria, and Fargo, ND.

In December 1972 Mississippi Valley Airlines had scheduled service to Minneapolis–St. Paul International Airport and Willmar Municipal Airport

FAA Award History 
In 2020 the airport received a $30,000 CARES Act award.

References

External links 
 Aerial photo as of 27 April 1992 from USGS The National Map
 

Airports in Minnesota
Buildings and structures in Douglas County, Minnesota
Transportation in Douglas County, Minnesota